The Committee for Safeguarding National Security of the Hong Kong Special Administrative Region is a committee established by the Government of Hong Kong as a result of the enactment of the Hong Kong national security law by the Standing Committee of the National People's Congress. It is supervised by and accountable to the Central People's Government (State Council).

The committee is chaired by the Chief Executive, as stated in Article 13 of the law. The committee's other members are the Chief Secretary for Administration, the Financial Secretary, the Secretary for Justice, the Secretary for Security, the Commissioner of Police, the head of the department for safeguarding national security of the Hong Kong Police Force, the Director of Immigration, the Commissioner of Customs and Excise, and the Director of the Chief Executive's Office.

Organisation 
On 2 July 2020, Eric Chan was appointed as secretary-general of the committee.

On 3 July 2020, a Hong Kong government spokesperson stated that the Committee for Safeguarding National Security of the Hong Kong Special Administrative Region was formally established with Carrie Lam as chairwoman and Eric Chan as secretary-general. The other members are Matthew Cheung Kin-chung (Chief Secretary for Administration), Paul Chan Mo-po (Financial Secretary), Teresa Cheng (Secretary for Justice), John Lee Ka-chiu (Secretary for Security), Chris Tang (Commissioner of Hong Kong Police Force), Edwina Lau Chi-wai (Deputy Commissioner of Hong Kong Police Force and the head of the Department for safeguarding national security of the Hong Kong Police Force), Au Ka-wang (Director of Immigration), and Hermes Tang Yi-hoi (Commissioner of Customs and Excise).
Also on 3 July 2020, Luo Huining, the director of the Liaison Office was appointed by the State Council to the role of the committee's National Security Adviser. The creation of this post is stipulated by Article 15 of the national security law. The Australian Strategic Policy Institute opined that the post now appeared to be the most powerful position in Hong Kong.

The committee convened its first meeting on 6 July 2020.

According to the Hong Kong national security law, the Committee comprises the following ex-officio members:
Chief Executive (as the Chairman)
Chief Secretary for Administration
Financial Secretary
Secretary for Justice
Secretary for Security
Commissioner of Police
Deputy Commissioner of Police (National Security)
Director of Immigration
Commissioner of Customs and Excise
Director of the Chief Executive's Office

Duties and functions of the Committee 
Article 14 of the Hong Kong national security law specifies three duties and functions of the committee:

 Analysing and assessing developments in relation to safeguarding national security in the Hong Kong Special Administrative Region, making work plans, and formulating policies for safeguarding national security in the Region;
 advancing the development of the legal system and enforcement mechanisms of the Region for safeguarding national security; and
 coordinating major work and significant operations for safeguarding national security in the Region.

Article 14 further states: "No institution, organisation or individual in the Region shall interfere with the work of the Committee.", and that its decisions are not amenable to judicial review. Article 18 specifies that prosecutors of the division "for the prosecution of offences endangering national security and other related legal work" – established by the same law – have to be approved by the committee prior to their appointment by the Secretary of Justice.

Article 43 stipulates that the committee supervises the implementation of the powers which law enforcement agencies, including the Hong Kong Police force, have under the national security law.

Candidate eligibility review

In March 2021, after the National People's Congress passed a decision to only allow "patriots" to serve in the government, the committee added a new responsibility; it will make decisions on the suitability of candidates for elections. As laid out in Annexes I and II of the Basic Law as amended by the Standing Committee of the National People's Congress, it will do so through making a recommendation to the Candidate Eligibility Review Committee (CERC). The CERC was established on 6 July 2021.

Under the amended Annexes of the Basic Law, a Candidate Eligibility Review mechanism is established to review and confirm of eligibility of candidates for the Election Committee, Chief Executive and Legislative Council elections, consisting of the following steps:
 Review by the department for safeguarding national security of the Hong Kong Police Force on whether a candidate meets the legal requirements and conditions of upholding the Basic Law and swearing allegiance to HKSAR of PRC;
 the Committee for Safeguarding National Security of the Hong Kong Special Administrative Region issues opinion in respect of a candidate who fails to meet such legal requirements and conditions on the basis of the police review; and
 Review and Confirmation of eligibility of candidates by the Candidate Eligibility Review Committee of the HKSAR.

On 26 August 2021, lawmaker Cheng Chung-tai was disqualified as a Legislative Council member in the vetting process of his ex officio membership in the Election Committee.

Sanctioning of Committee members by the United States 
Carrie Lam, Eric Chan, Teresa Cheng, John Lee, Chris Tang, and Luo Huining were among those sanctioned by the United States Treasury in August 2020 pursuant to the Normalization Executive Order (Executive Order 13936).
The order had been issued by US President Donald Trump on 14 July in response to the imposition of the national security law. Edwina Lau was sanctioned by the US on 9 November as one of four more officials.

History 
In January 2023, the committee said that the law in Hong Kong should be changed to ban overseas lawyers from national security cases. This came after Jimmy Lai had attempted to hire Tim Owen as his lawyer, and a subsequent approval in December 2022 by the Standing Committee of the National People's Congress of an interpretationnot in relation to a Lai's casethat the chief executive and the committee had the final say in whether overseas lawyers could be admitted in national security cases.

See also 

National Security Commission of the Communist Party of China

References

2020 establishments in Hong Kong
Hong Kong national security law
Hong Kong Government